Liu Jun (born September 25, 1983 in Qingdao, Shandong) is a Chinese football goalkeeper.

Club career

Guandong Mingfeng
As a youngster Liu Jun would be called up to the various levels of the Chinese national youth teams while he was with the Guangdong Mingfeng youth team. Despite playing for a team who were at the bottom of the Chinese pyramid he would, however be unable to break into the senior team of Guangdong Mingfeng. The club would decide not to continue to play within the professional Chinese pyramid anymore and Liu Jun was allowed to leave to continue with his studies where he went to Qingdao University and played amateur football with them.

Qingdao Jonoon
Despite playing at a lower level Liu Jun was brought into the Chinese Super League by Qingdao Zhongneng (now known as Qingdao Jonoon) as back up for their goalkeeper Liu Zhenli during the 2007 league season. He would have to wait a whole season before he could make his debut for Qingdao on July 6, 2008 against Beijing Guoan in a 1-0 defeat. A constant understudy within the team he would only become a consistent member of the starting lineup after first choice keeper Liu Zhenli was injured in September 2009 and while he impressed for a short period Liu Zhenli quickly regained his position.

Career statistics 

Statistics accurate as of match played 31 December 2020.

References

External links 
Player stats at Sohu.com
Player stats at Sodasoccer.com

1983 births
Living people
Association football goalkeepers
Chinese footballers
Footballers from Qingdao
Qingdao Hainiu F.C. (1990) players
Chinese Super League players
China League One players
China League Two players
21st-century Chinese people